Amy Makes Three is an unreleased American psychological thriller, written and directed by Josh Sternfeld.

Principal photography began on June 23, 2015 in Wappingers Falls, Dutchess County in upstate New York.

Premise
An affluent young couple struggles to overcome grief by confronting the ghost of their first child, who died as a premature baby.

Cast
 Torrey DeVitto as Carla Forrest
 Mike Doyle as Greg Forrest
 Ursula Parker as Amy Forrest

Filming
Initial photography began in Dutchess County in upstate New York on June 23, 2015.

Release
As of September 2017 the Amy Makes Three home page still displays a "Coming 2016" notice, no further release date has been revealed.

References

External links
Home page.
 

Unreleased American films
American psychological thriller films
Films shot in New York City
Films shot in the United States
Films directed by Josh Sternfeld